Know Your Enemy is a saying derived from Sun Tzu's The Art of War. It may also refer to:

Music
 Know Your Enemy (Lȧȧz Rockit album), 1987
 Know Your Enemy (Manic Street Preachers album), 2001
 Know Your Enemy, an album by Behind Enemy Lines
 "Know Your Enemy" (Green Day song), 2009
 "Know Your Enemy" (Rage Against the Machine song), 1992
 "Know Your Enemy", a song by Hybrid from the album Morning Sci-Fi
 "Know Your Enemy", a song composed by Yoko Kanno from Ghost in the Shell: Stand Alone Complex O.S.T. 3
 "Know Your Enemy", a song by Killswitch Engage from Atonement

Other uses
 Know Your Enemy (podcast), American political podcast
 Know Your Enemy: Japan, a 1945 American propaganda film
 "Know Your Enemy", a 2018 episode of Voltron: Legendary Defender

See also
 "Know Thy Enemy", an episode of the television series The Vampire Diaries